Haozhou or Hao Prefecture was a zhou (prefecture) in imperial China centering on modern Fengyang County, Anhui, China. It existed (intermittently) from 582 to 1367.

Geography
The administrative region of Haozhou in the Tang dynasty is in modern Anhui. It probably includes parts of modern: 
 Under the administration of Chuzhou:
 Fengyang County
 Mingguang
 Dingyuan County
 Under the administration of Bengbu:
 Bengbu

References
 

Prefectures of the Sui dynasty
Prefectures of the Tang dynasty
Prefectures of the Song dynasty
Prefectures of the Yuan dynasty
Subprefectures of the Ming dynasty
Prefectures of Yang Wu
Prefectures of Southern Tang
Prefectures of Later Zhou
Former prefectures in Anhui